Demangevelle is a commune in the Haute-Saône department in the region of Bourgogne-Franche-Comté in eastern France.

Geography
The Côney forms part of the commune's north-eastern border, flows south-westward through the middle of the commune, and forms part of the commune's south-western border.

See also
Communes of the Haute-Saône department

References

Communes of Haute-Saône